The Punjab Educational Endowment Fund (PEEF) is a program governed by the Government of Punjab to establish opportunities for the bright boys and girls students. It was started in 2008 by its chairman Shahbaz Sharif (Chief Minister of the Punjab). It gives the scholarship to bright students which cannot afford their fees. The Punjab Educational Endowment Fund (PEEF) is an initiative of the Government of Punjab. In order to make it more efficient, transparent and autonomous in its functioning, it is registered under section 42 of the Companies Ordinance, 1984.
The company was registered on 31st Dec. 2008 and an initial endowment fund was established with a seed money of Rs.2 billion. The endowment fund has now been increased to Rs. 8 billion and the Government of Punjab, Pakistan has pledged to raise the endowment fund to Rs. 10 billion during the current FY 2012-13. Only the investment proceeds out of this fund are utilized for the award of scholarships.
PEEF is established with the objective of providing scholarships to talented and needy students for pursuing quality education with equal opportunities. The Punjab Educational Endowment Fund endeavors to bring best educational opportunities to the less privileged and talented youth of Punjab, and bring them at par with the most fortunate ones and is striving to achieve the following objectives:
 Scholarship for talented and less privileged students of Pakistan, specially Punjab, Pakistan, to bring them at par with the more fortunate one's
 Creation of a critical mass of talented youth for the development of society
 Identification and support to extremely marginalized students through special quotas
 Supporting the less privileged and best students of PBTE, other provinces - including Azad Kashmir, FATA, Gilgit-Baltistan & Islamabad Capital Territory.
Since the commencement of its operations in 2009; PEEF has so far awarded more than 41000 scholarships worth more than PKRs. 2 billion.

Objectives 
Building a critical mass of human capital, participating in nation building; through provision of equitable opportunities to less privileged but academically brilliant girls and boys in Punjab, Pakistan.

Head office 
The organization is located in capital of Pakistani Punjab, Lahore, Pakistan.

Members of General Body 
 Shahbaz Sharif (Chairman)
 Dr. Amjad Saqib (Vice Chairman)
 Dr. Kamran Shams (CEO)

Registration 
PEEF is registered with: 
Securities and Exchange Commission of Pakistan under section 42 of Companies Ordinance, 1984
Federal Board of Revenue under section 10 of Finance Act 2001.

Certification 
Punjab Educational Endowment Fund has certified by Moody International with the requirements of ISO 9001:2008.

Success story 
There are a lot of such students who gained this scholarship and succeeded in their lives. They achieved wonderful positions. Some of them are;
 Mr. Muhammad Usman, Multan - Cultural Exchange Program in United States 2012/13.
 MR. Faisal Wasemm Qureshi, Bahawalpur - MSc. in Information Technology from University of Sussex, UK.
 Mr. Muhammad Rashid Kareem, Dera Ghazi Khan - MSc in Micro Electronics System Design from University of Southampton, UK.
 Mr. Muhammad Habib Ullah - MSc. degree from The University of Manchester, UK.
 Mr. Yasir Mahmood -  MSc. degree from the University of Birmingham, UK.
 Ms. Hina Faroq, National University of Sciences and Technology, Pakistan - PEEF Ambassador
 Engr. Waqas Ahmad, Software Engineering (University of Engineering and Technology, Taxila), MS (University of Wollongong, Australia).
 Mr. Waqas Rafiq - MSc. Digital Communication Systems from Loughborough University, United Kingdom.
 Mr. Saad Zafar - M.Sc. Thermal Power and Fluid Engineering from The University of Manchester, UK.
 Ms. Amina Javaid (single child of her parents) - blind peef scholar, BSc. Political Science from Kinnaird College, Lahore.
 Mr. Tanveer Uz Zaman - Peef Ambassador
 Mr. Abdul Raheem - Engineer from Quaid-e-Awam University of Engineering, Science and Technology, Nawabshah.
 Mr. Muhammad Luqman Bashir - Kamonkay, Gujranwala.
 Mr. Muddasir Rehman - Peef Ambassador.
 Mr. Umair Zahid, University of Engineering and Technology, Taxila - Member at National Youth Assembly.
 Mr. Jamil Ahmad - M.Sc. in Engineering from University of Leeds.
 Mr. Muhammad Usman Gujjar - Cultural Exchange Program in United States.
 Ms. Sibgha Tahir - MS. GENETIC & BIO ENGINEERING (THESIS) Fatih University, Turkey.
 and many more. . .

References

External links 
 PEEF's official website

2008 establishments in Pakistan
Government agencies established in 2008
Education in Punjab, Pakistan
Government of Punjab, Pakistan